Edigar Junio Teixeira Lima (born 30 November 1990), known as Edigar Junio, is a Brazilian footballer who plays as a forward for Japanese club V-Varen Nagasaki.

Club career
Edigar Junio Teixeira Lima was born in Gama, Federal District, joined Atlético Paranaense's youth setup in 2008, after starting it out at Paraná Soccer Technical Center. He made his first team – and Série A –debut on 30 June 2011, coming on as a second half substitute for Paulo Baier and scoring his side's only in a 1–3 away loss against Fluminense.

On 13 July, Edigar Junio renewed his link with Furacão until 2016. He subsequently lost his place in the main squad, being assigned to the under-23's, which were playing in Campeonato Paranaense.

On 10 June 2013 Edigar Junio was loaned to Série B's Joinville, along with teammate Bruno Costa. He remained at JEC in 2014, and scored 12 goals as his side was crowned champions.

In January 2015, Edigar Junio returned to Atlético, being assigned in the main squad.

Honours 
Joinville
Campeonato Brasileiro Série B: 2014

Bahia
Copa do Nordeste: 2017
Campeonato Baiano: 2018

Yokohama F. Marinos
J1 League: 2019

References

External links

1990 births
Living people
Sportspeople from Federal District (Brazil)
Brazilian footballers
Association football forwards
Campeonato Brasileiro Série A players
Campeonato Brasileiro Série B players
Club Athletico Paranaense players
Joinville Esporte Clube players
Esporte Clube Bahia players
J1 League players
J2 League players
Yokohama F. Marinos players
V-Varen Nagasaki players
Brazilian expatriate footballers
Brazilian expatriate sportspeople in Japan
Expatriate footballers in Japan